Aladar Szabo (15 March 1933 – 12 October 1982) was a Hungarian-Brazilian water polo player. He competed in the men's tournament at the 1964 Summer Olympics.

References

1933 births
1982 deaths
Brazilian male water polo players
Olympic water polo players of Brazil
Water polo players at the 1964 Summer Olympics
Sportspeople from Eger